Tommies could refer to:

Tommy Atkins - slang for a common soldier in the First World War
Crocus tommasinianus - a flowering plant
Thomson's gazelle - a species of antelope
Tommies (radio drama) - A BBC radio drama.
The Thompson Community Singers, a gospel choir started by Milton Brunson